New York State Route 25A (NY 25A) is a state highway on Long Island in New York, United States. The highway is a northern alternate route of NY 25, which follows a more inland routing along Jericho Turnpike.

The route is known for its scenic path through decidedly lesser-developed areas such as Brookville, Fort Salonga, Centerport, and the Roslyn Viaduct. It is known by various names along its routing, the most prominent of which include Northern Boulevard, North Hempstead Turnpike, Main Street, Fort Salonga Road, and North Country Road.

Route description

Queens
NY 25A begins at I-495 exit 14—the second exit off the expressway—in Long Island City in the New York City borough of Queens. The route initially heads northward, following 21st Street for three blocks before turning northeast onto Jackson Avenue. Here, NY 25A widens from two to four lanes, a width that the road retains well into Nassau County. The highway serves the Long Island City Courthouse on its way to a junction with Queens Boulevard (NY 25) at the foot of the Queensboro Bridge. Here, the road changes names again, becoming Northern Boulevard. Unlike the first two names, the Northern Boulevard name extends for a considerable distance, remaining with NY 25A through the neighborhoods of Long Island City, Woodside, Jackson Heights, Corona, East Elmhurst, Flushing, Bayside, Douglaston and Little Neck. Northern Boulevard is the starting point of several prominent streets, such as Springfield Boulevard, Steinway Street, Roosevelt Avenue and Woodside Avenue.

As Northern Boulevard, NY 25A begins to follow a more easterly path, loosely paralleling the Sunnyside Yard to the south. NY 25A continues east into Woodside, and the Brooklyn–Queens Expressway (I-278) intersects with Northern Boulevard at the Woodside–Jackson Heights border. Northern Boulevard serves as the southern border for East Elmhurst from the Brooklyn-Queens Expressway to 114th Street. It also serves as the northern border for Jackson Heights and North Corona. NY 25A becomes a part of a large street grid and running along a linear alignment through Jackson Heights, Corona, and East Elmhurst. It eventually reaches Flushing Meadows-Corona Park, where the highway intersects with the Grand Central Parkway just northwest of Citi Field. For the next mile (1.6 km), NY 25A is a limited-access highway connecting the Grand Central Parkway with I-678. This was a former segment of the Belt Parkway system, originally intended to be part of the formerly proposed Astoria Expressway.

Northern Boulevard continues through Flushing—where it was once known as Broadway—towards Bayside. The route travels generally easterly across Bayside, intersecting with the Clearview Expressway (I-295) along the way. Not far to the east, it crosses over the Cross Island Parkway at Alley Pond Park. Past the Cross Island Parkway, NY 25A goes through Douglaston and Little Neck before crossing the New York City line into Nassau County. The five-mile (8 km) stretch of Northern Boulevard stretching eastward from Flushing has been described as roughly coterminous with the Long Island Koreatown (롱 아일랜드 코리아타운).

Nassau County

NY 25A, still bearing the Northern Boulevard name, crosses into Nassau County at the Great Neck hamlet known as University Gardens. It winds its way around a steep curve in the Great Neck area before descending into Manhasset and the hamlet's Miracle Mile shopping area. The route continues eastward, intersecting with NY 101 and Nassau County Route 101 (Port Washington Boulevard and Searingtown Road, respectively) just south of Port Washington, in the villages of Flower Hill (on its north side) and Roslyn Estates (on its south side), ahead of a split in Northern Boulevard. Old Northern Boulevard, which once carried the NY 25A designation, is the old route, which passes through the village of Roslyn, whilst Northern Boulevard itself bypasses the village via. the Roslyn Viaduct, which carries NY 25A over Hempstead Harbor.

The old and new routes converge east of the viaduct at an interchange with Bryant Avenue, and Northern Boulevard heads northeastward through East Hills and Greenvale, where it intersects with Glen Cove Road. In Brookville, NY 25A passes the New York Institute of Technology and the C.W. Post Campus of Long Island University before intersecting with NY 107. Past this point, the route slowly curves back to the east ahead of a junction with NY 106 south of East Norwich. NY 25A's run as a four-lane road ends here, and the route becomes a simple two-lane country road. It briefly reverts to four lanes at Cold Spring Road, and the highway enters Suffolk County less than a mile (1.6 km) later.

Some discrepancy exists over NY 25A's street name in Nassau County, particularly regarding the eastern half of the county. While signage for Northern Boulevard exists as far east as Cold Spring Road, implying that Northern Boulevard extends from Queens to the Suffolk line, several businesses located between NY 107 and NY 106 give North Hempstead Turnpike as the highway's name. Additionally, an old, undated Hagstrom Map from the late 1940s indicates that the Turnpike name extends as far west as the Queens line.

Suffolk County

NY 25A makes a sharp northward turn just inside the county line at an intersection with NY 108. It travels through Cold Spring Harbor, where it is initially called Harbor Road, and then Main Street, before curving back to the east and heading into downtown Huntington. In the hamlet, the road widens to four lanes and is also known as Main Street. At an intersection with County Route 35 (CR 35) on the east side of Huntington, NY 25A narrows to two lanes once more and heads toward Centerport, where it becomes Fort Salonga Road. This name remains in place through Centerport, Northport and Fort Salonga to the vicinity of Sunken Meadow State Park. Just south of the park, NY 25A intersects with its first limited-access highway since the Cross Island Parkway in Queens when it encounters the northernmost exit on the Sunken Meadow State Parkway.

Past the parkway, the route changes names from Fort Salonga Road to Main Street as it enters Kings Park, home to the now-closed Kings Park Psychiatric Center. The similarly numbered New York State Bicycle Route 25A (NY Bike Route 25A) joins NY 25A here, switching from CR 11 to NY 25A at the former's east end in the center of the hamlet. NY 25A continues on an eastward track to San Remo (just east of Kings Park), where it makes a sharp southward turn at an intersection with St. Johnland Road in the center of the community. The route takes on the St. Johnland Road name and loosely parallels the Nissequogue River as it heads toward Smithtown. They cross just west of the Village of the Branch at the Smithtown Bull, where NY 25A intersects with its parent route. NY Bike Route 25A ends here; however, NY 25A continues east into the hamlet of Smithtown by way of an overlap with NY 25 along Jericho Turnpike.

The Jericho Turnpike name ends a short distance into the community at a junction with Edgewood Avenue, giving way to Main Street. The Main Street name continues into the adjacent Village of the Branch, where NY 25 and NY 25A split at an intersection that also serves as the northern terminus of NY 111. The latter route heads to the South Shore of Long Island while NY 25 continues eastward and NY 25A heads northeast toward St. James and Stony Brook as North Country Road. This section of NY 25A runs along the Port Jefferson Branch of the Long Island Rail Road (LIRR) and is also mostly part of NY Bike Route 25, with occasional diversions. Along this stretch, NY 25A passes the Stony Brook Museum and Carriage House and Stony Brook University.

On the eastern edge of the Stony Brook campus, the route intersects with the north end of CR 97 (Nicolls Road). It continues on a generally northeasterly track to East Setauket, where it turns to head due east toward Port Jefferson. It enters the village as West Broadway, but turns south onto Main Street once the road reaches the harbor. NY 25A follows Main Street southeastward to Port Jefferson Station, home to the end of the LIRR's Port Jefferson Branch and NY 25A's junction with the north end of NY 112. At the latter, NY 25A makes a sharp turn to the east, heading through the hamlet on Hallock Avenue toward its intersection with NY 347 (Nesconset Highway). NY 347 ends here, and NY 25A briefly becomes a wider highway to match the width of the former road.

About  from NY 347, NY 25A intersects with CR 83 (Patchogue–Mount Sinai Road). From here, the road passes through Mount Sinai and Miller Place before splitting again to bypass Rocky Point. The old path of the road passes through the community while NY 25A veers south of the hamlet. They reconnect east of Rocky Point to continue toward Shoreham and an intersection with CR 46 (William Floyd Parkway) near Brookhaven State Park. NY 25A continues east for another  through Wading River to a fork in the road at Calverton National Cemetery, where the route veers southeast while Sound Avenue, the other leg of the fork, heads due east towards the North Fork of Long Island.

History

Origins
The route in Queens and Nassau County was originally an east–west Indian trail used to get from the current town of North Hempstead to Flushing. Meanwhile, the original road in Suffolk County was realigned and straightened in several locations prior to becoming a state highway. The old route is now known as North Country Road from Port Jefferson Station to Sound Beach (formerly CR 20) and from Shoreham to Wading River. From Smithtown to Saint James, it is now Edgewood Avenue (itself once CR 87).

A handful of smaller, mostly local sections also exist. In Northport, the through road originally utilized Woodbine Avenue from Fort Salonga Road to Main Street and Bayview Avenue, and all of Main Street from there to Fort Salonga Road. In Setauket, it followed Main Street from Ridgeway Avenue and North Country Road to Old Town Road and current NY 25A. Finally, in Port Jefferson, the main road was initially East Broadway from Main Street and West Broadway to East Main Street, and East Main Street from there to the current Main Street.

Designation
All of modern NY 25A east of the New York City limits was originally designated as part of NY 25 in the mid-1920s. At the time, the section of Jericho Turnpike between New York City and Smithtown was state-maintained but unnumbered. It gained a designation  when it was designated as NY 25A. By 1930, NY 25 was shifted southward onto its modern alignment between Smithtown and Riverhead while NY 25A was extended east over its former routing via Port Jefferson. In the 1930 renumbering of state highways in New York, the alignments of NY 25 and NY 25A west of Smithtown were flipped, placing NY 25 on Jericho Turnpike and NY 25A on the more northerly route via Roslyn and Huntington.

NY 25A was one of several routes that was extended west into New York City in mid-December 1934 when the city signed routes within its limits for the first time. The route followed Northern Boulevard west across northern Queens to Queens Boulevard, which at the time carried NY 24 and NY 25. Here, NY 25A joined NY 24 and NY 25 across the Queensboro Bridge into Manhattan, where it followed 2nd Avenue and 57th Street for five blocks to meet NY 22 and NY 100 at Park Avenue. The extension into Manhattan was eliminated by 1952 when NY 25A was truncated to the intersection of Northern and Queens Boulevards. In the 1960s, NY 25A was extended southwestward along Jackson Avenue to meet the Long Island Expressway (I-495) just east of where it enters the Queens–Midtown Tunnel.

The east end of NY 25A was reconfigured  to follow Sound Avenue across the north shore of Long Island from Wading River to Mattituck, where it rejoined NY 25. The former routing of NY 25A between Sound Avenue and NY 25 west of Riverhead went unnumbered until the early 1940s when it was re-designated as NY 254. NY 25A was moved back onto its original routing through the town of Riverhead in the early 1950s, supplanting NY 254 in the process.

Former sections

NY 25A has been realigned in several locations in order to bypass local streets or entire communities along its routing. Segments like the Roslyn Viaduct, for example, allow traffic to flow more freely over Hempstead Harbor and keeping the historic community to the south preserved intact. The old route through this area is now Old Northern Boulevard, East Broadway, and a section of Main Street in Roslyn between two parts of Old Northern Boulevard. This piece of Main Street is also part of its own historic district. Several smaller sections also exist:

 Huntington: Old Northport Road between Woodruff Court and Huntington Crescent Club.
 Centerport: between Little Neck Road (former CR 86) and Centershore Road.
 Northport: between Troy Court and the driveway to Stonyhill Equestrian Center.
 Fort Salonga: Old Route 25A from east of Sunken Meadow Road to east of Tanyard Place.
 Smithtown: Realigned segment between John Street and Monroe Street, and again at the vicinity of Stone Gate Court.
 Setauket: North Country Road from Bennet's Road to Ridgeway Avenue and Main Street; Ridgeway Avenue from there to current NY 25A.
 Rocky Point: North Country Road from west of Rocky Point Landing Road to Woodville Road. The current alignment carries the designation NY 25A Bypass, with the former alignment designated as NY 25A Business.

Proposed bypasses
Several bypasses were planned for NY 25A by the New York State Department of Transportation. Only the Roslyn Viaduct and the Rocky Point Bypass were constructed; other attempts to realign the highway were cancelled as a result of public opposition. The projects were largely opposed out of fear that they would lower property values and bring more traffic jams and rampant development. 

The proposed bypasses were:
 Manhasst Bypass (also known as the Miracle Mile Bypass): from East Shore Road to Manhasset Woods Road, crossing Whitney Pond and Shelter Rock Road. The proposal would have consisted of a four-lane or six-lane bypass south of the Miracle Mile, bypassing its western half, and would have cost approximately $5,000,000-$8,000,000 (1956 USD). Approximately 10 homes in the South Strathmore subdivision would have been acquired through eminent domain, and would have also taken portions of property from two churches as well as from the Munsey Park School (and closing off one of its major exits). It also would have severed one of the South Strathmore subdivision's major entrances/exits.
A similar proposal was made in 1968 when the Spinney Hill area near Whitney Pond was preparing to receive a slum removal/urban renewal project. This proposal would have created a bypass between East Shore Road and Plandome Road.
North Shore Expressway (Lloyd Harbor–Kings Park): from Syosset–Cold Spring Road to Main Street, running mostly along Pulaski Road (CR 11).
 Smithtown Bypass North (San Remo–Saint James): beginning at East Main Street, St. Johnland Road, and Rose Street, and ending somewhere in the vicinity of Edgewood Avenue (eastern intersection). Upon completion of this segment, NY 111 would have been extended to Saint James.
 Setauket–Port Jefferson Station Bypass: beginning between North Country Road and Ridgeway Drive, and ending at NY 112 at Hallock Avenue. Upon completion of this segment, NY 112 was to be extended along Main Street to the Port Jefferson–Bridgeport Ferry. Instead, much of the right-of-way was converted into a bicycle trail.
 Nugent Drive Extension: beginning at the intersection of NY 25A and Sound Avenue, it would have veered right before Hulse Landing Road (CR 54), then turned south to cross NY 25 east of its current terminus before finally reaching Edwards Avenue in Calverton north of the former railroad station. From there, it would have replaced Edwards Avenue and connected with the existing section southeast of exit 71 at the Long Island Expressway. Like the existing section of Nugent Drive, it was to be designated CR 94, and would have been concurrent with NY 25A from Wading River to CR 94A (Center Drive Spur), as well as NY 24. NY 25A would have ended at Main Street (NY 25) in Riverhead.

Major intersections

See also

References

General references
 Old Hagstroms Long Island and Suffolk County Maps.
 Smithtown Public Library Local History Department.

External links

 Greater New York Roads – New York State Route 25A
 New York State Route 25A (Mile by Mile)

025A
Streets in Queens, New York
Transportation in Nassau County, New York
Transportation in Suffolk County, New York
Manhasset, New York
Roads on Long Island